MFAC may refer to:
 Matthew Flinders Anglican College
 Ministry of Foreign Affairs and Cooperation (East Timor)